The 1938–39 Cornell Big Red men's ice hockey season was the 32nd season of play for the program. The teams was coached by Nick Bawlf in his 17th season.

Season
Cornell's season began with a early-season tournament at the Jack Shea Arena in Lake Placid. The team was forced to pay their own way to get to the cite and, due to several players living too far away during the Christmas break, the Big Red were handicapped before the games were even played. The meet took place between seven colleges but and was advertised as a 'practice tournament'. At the time the term was typically used to refer to games that would not be considered for rankings; in modern terminology, the games would have been non-conference rather than exhibition matches.

Despite being on ice for only half a dozen sessions, Cornell opened the tournament with a bang, throttling St. Lawrence 11–1. After defeating the ordinarily powerful Hamilton Continentals in the second game, Cornell finished their otherwise successful appearance with a narrow loss to Williams. Cornell was set to face Colgate immediately after returning from the break, however, rain and warm weather forced the match to be cancelled.

The lack of practice time degraded the team's effectiveness. When they travelled to play Clarkson, the Big Red were overpowered 1–9. While the defense would put forth a better effort in the team's final two games, the offense remained dormant and Cornell ended the year on a 4-game losing streak. Cornell had scheduled a match against Columbia in late January, their last chance for a home game, but the Lions ended up cancelling their entire season.

Roster

Standings

Schedule and results

|-
!colspan=12 style=";"| 

|-
!colspan=12 style=";" | Regular Season

References

Cornell Big Red men's ice hockey seasons
Cornell
Cornell
Cornell
Cornell